Chandrika is a brand of  herbal soap manufactured and sold in India by SV Products. The product was launched in 1940. Though the concept was devised by, and the company was founded by, C. R. Kesavan Vaidyar, it is now owned by Bangalore-headquartered Wipro. Marketing rights for Chandrika was acquired by Wipro Consumer Care and Lighting from Kerala-based SV Products.

Ingredients
According to the company, the ingredients in Chandrika soap are coconut oil, caustic soda (with higher percentage),wild ginger, lime peel oil, hydnocarpus oil, orange oil, and sandalwood oil. Each is claimed to have a particular medicinal value.

External link
 Official website

References

Indian soap brands
Economy of Karnataka